Club de rencontres is a 1987 French comedy film directed and written by Michel Lang. The film stars Francis Perrin.

Cast
Francis Perrin...  Nicolas Bergereau 
Jean-Paul Comart ...  Bernard Lognon 
Valérie Allain ...  Christiane, dite Cricri 
Isabelle Mergault ...  Bunny 
Herma Vos ...  Jutta 
Blanche Ravalec ...  Marion 
Anne Deleuze ...  Agnès Bergereau 
Jean Rougerie ...  Le voisin colérique 
Charles Gérard ...  Le commissaire 
Henri Guybet ...  L'inspecteur Etienne Gandin 
Caroline Jacquin...  Yveline, la secrétaire 
Gaëlle Legrand ...  Marie-Solange, l'ex de Bernard 
Léon Spigelman ...  Sammy Blumenstrauss 
Katia Tchenko ...  Paméla, la nymphomane 
Michel Crémadès ...  Garazzi, le violeur 
Andrée Damant ...  The lady
Louba Guertchikoff ...  Rachel Blumenstrauss 
Fernand Guiot ...  Le patron de l'agence immobilière

External links 

1987 films
1980s sex comedy films
1980s French-language films
French sex comedy films
1987 comedy films
Films directed by Michel Lang
1980s French films